Aleksei Vladimirovich Semyonov (born 12 April 1983) is a Russian former professional footballer.

Club career
He made his debut in the Russian Premier League in 2007 for FC Khimki.

References

1983 births
Footballers from Saint Petersburg
Living people
Russian footballers
FC Khimki players
FC Baltika Kaliningrad players
Russian Premier League players
FC Volga Nizhny Novgorod players
FC SKA-Khabarovsk players
FC Petrotrest players
FC Salyut Belgorod players
Association football midfielders
FC Tambov players
FC Dynamo Vologda players
FC Nosta Novotroitsk players